"Respect Yourself" is a song by Swiss artist DJ BoBo, released in December 1996 as the second single from his third album, World in Motion (1996). The song features vocals by American singers Lori Glori and Jocelyn Brown, and the choir United Spirits. A major hit in Europe, it peaked at number two in Czech Republic, number seven in Finland, number 16 in Switzerland, number 23 in Austria and number 31 in Germany. On the Eurochart Hot 100, the single reached number 52 in January 1997. DJ BoBo performed it at the World Music Awards in Monaco in April 1997. The accompanying music video was directed by Thomas Job.

Track listing

Charts

References

 

1996 singles
1996 songs
DJ BoBo songs
English-language Swiss songs
Jocelyn Brown songs
Songs written by Axel Breitung
Songs written by DJ BoBo
ZYX Music singles